Bazlyk (Baźlıq) is a rural locality (a selo) in and the administrative centre of Bazlyksky Selsoviet, Bizhbulyaksky District, Bashkortostan, Russia. The population was 916 as of 2010. There are 11 streets.

Geography 
Bazlyk is located 8 km north of Bizhbulyak (the district's administrative centre) by road. Yegorovka is the nearest rural locality.

References 

Rural localities in Bizhbulyaksky District